In mathematics, a 3-sphere, glome or hypersphere is a higher-dimensional analogue of a sphere. It may be embedded in 4-dimensional Euclidean space as the set of points equidistant from a fixed central point.  Analogous to how the boundary of a ball in three dimensions is an ordinary sphere (or 2-sphere, a two-dimensional surface), the boundary of a ball in four dimensions is a 3-sphere (an object with three dimensions).  A 3-sphere is an example of a 3-manifold and an n-sphere.

Definition
In coordinates, a 3-sphere with center  and radius  is the set of all points  in real, 4-dimensional space such that

The 3-sphere centered at the origin with radius 1 is called the unit 3-sphere and is usually denoted :

It is often convenient to regard  as the space with 2 complex dimensions or the quaternions. The unit 3-sphere is then given by

or

This description as the quaternions of norm one identifies the 3-sphere with the versors in the quaternion division ring. Just as the unit circle is important for planar polar coordinates, so the 3-sphere is important in the polar view of 4-space involved in quaternion multiplication. See polar decomposition of a quaternion for details of this development of the three-sphere.
This view of the 3-sphere is the basis for the study of elliptic space as developed by Georges Lemaître.

Properties

Elementary properties
The 3-dimensional surface volume of a 3-sphere of radius  is

while the 4-dimensional hypervolume (the content of the 4-dimensional region bounded by the 3-sphere) is

Every non-empty intersection of a 3-sphere with a three-dimensional hyperplane is a 2-sphere (unless the hyperplane is tangent to the 3-sphere, in which case the intersection is a single point). As a 3-sphere moves through a given three-dimensional hyperplane, the intersection starts out as a point, then becomes a growing 2-sphere that reaches its maximal size when the hyperplane cuts right through the "equator" of the 3-sphere. Then the 2-sphere shrinks again down to a single point as the 3-sphere leaves the hyperplane.

In a given three-dimensional hyperplane, a 3-sphere can rotate about an "equatorial plane" (analogous to a 2-sphere rotating about a central axis), in which case it appears to be a 2-sphere whose size is constant.

Topological properties
A 3-sphere is a compact, connected, 3-dimensional manifold without boundary. It is also simply connected. What this means, in the broad sense, is that any loop, or circular path, on the 3-sphere can be continuously shrunk to a point without leaving the 3-sphere. The Poincaré conjecture, proved in 2003 by Grigori Perelman, provides that the 3-sphere is the only three-dimensional manifold (up to homeomorphism) with these properties.

In general, any topological space that is homeomorphic to the 3-sphere is called a topological 3-sphere.

Any topological space with these homology groups is known as a homology 3-sphere. Infinitely many homology spheres are now known to exist. For example, a Dehn filling with slope  on any knot in the 3-sphere gives a homology sphere; typically these are not homeomorphic to the 3-sphere.

The higher-homotopy groups are all finite abelian but otherwise follow no discernible pattern. For more discussion see homotopy groups of spheres.

Geometric properties
The Euclidean metric on  induces a metric on the 3-sphere giving it the structure of a Riemannian manifold. As with all spheres, the 3-sphere has constant positive sectional curvature equal to  where  is the radius.

Much of the interesting geometry of the 3-sphere stems from the fact that the 3-sphere has a natural Lie group structure given by quaternion multiplication (see the section below on group structure). The only other spheres with such a structure are the 0-sphere and the 1-sphere (see circle group).

Unlike the 2-sphere, the 3-sphere admits nonvanishing vector fields (sections of its tangent bundle). One can even find three linearly independent and nonvanishing vector fields. These may be taken to be any left-invariant vector fields forming a basis for the Lie algebra of the 3-sphere. This implies that the 3-sphere is parallelizable. It follows that the tangent bundle of the 3-sphere is trivial. For a general discussion of the number of linear independent vector fields on a -sphere, see the article vector fields on spheres.

There is an interesting action of the circle group  on  giving the 3-sphere the structure of a principal circle bundle known as the Hopf bundle.
.
The orbit space of this action is homeomorphic to the two-sphere .

Topological construction
There are several well-known constructions of the three-sphere.  Here we describe gluing a pair of three-balls and then the one-point compactification.

Gluing
A 3-sphere can be constructed topologically by "gluing" together the boundaries of a pair of 3-balls. The boundary of a 3-ball is a 2-sphere, and these two 2-spheres are to be identified.  That is, imagine a pair of 3-balls of the same size, then superpose them so that their 2-spherical boundaries match, and let matching pairs of points on the pair of 2-spheres be identically equivalent to each other.  In analogy with the case of the 2-sphere (see below), the gluing surface is called an equatorial sphere.

Note that the interiors of the 3-balls are not glued to each other.  One way to think of the fourth dimension is as a continuous real-valued function of the 3-dimensional coordinates of the 3-ball, perhaps considered to be "temperature".  We take the "temperature" to be zero along the gluing 2-sphere and let one of the 3-balls be "hot" and let the other 3-ball be "cold". The "hot" 3-ball could be thought of as the "upper hemisphere" and the "cold" 3-ball could be thought of as the "lower hemisphere". The temperature is highest/lowest at the centers of the two 3-balls.

This construction is analogous to a construction of a 2-sphere, performed by gluing the boundaries of a pair of disks. A disk is a 2-ball, and the boundary of a disk is a circle (a 1-sphere). Let a pair of disks be of the same diameter.  Superpose them and glue corresponding points on their boundaries.  Again one may think of the third dimension as temperature.  Likewise, we may inflate the 2-sphere, moving the pair of disks to become the northern and southern hemispheres.

One-point compactification
After removing a single point from the 2-sphere, what remains is homeomorphic to the Euclidean plane. In the same way, removing a single point from the 3-sphere yields three-dimensional space. 
An extremely useful way to see this is via stereographic projection. We first describe the lower-dimensional version.

Rest the south pole of a unit 2-sphere on the -plane in three-space.  We map a point  of the sphere (minus the north pole ) to the plane by sending  to the intersection of the line  with the plane.  Stereographic projection of a 3-sphere (again removing the north pole) maps to three-space in the same manner.  (Notice that, since stereographic projection is conformal, round spheres are sent to round spheres or to planes.)

A somewhat different way to think of the one-point compactification is via the exponential map.  Returning to our picture of the unit two-sphere sitting on the Euclidean plane: Consider a geodesic in the plane, based at the origin, and map this to a geodesic in the two-sphere of the same length, based at the south pole.  Under this map all points of the circle of radius  are sent to the north pole.  Since the open unit disk is homeomorphic to the Euclidean plane, this is again a one-point compactification.

The exponential map for 3-sphere is similarly constructed; it may also be discussed using the fact that the 3-sphere is the Lie group of unit quaternions.

Coordinate systems on the 3-sphere
As a 3-dimensional manifold one should be able to parameterize  by three coordinates, just as one can parameterize the 2-sphere using two coordinates (such as latitude and longitude). Due to the nontrivial topology of  it is impossible to find a single set of coordinates that cover the entire space. Just as on the 2-sphere, one must use at least two coordinate charts. Some different choices of coordinates are given below.

Hyperspherical coordinates
One such choice — by no means unique — is to use , where

The round metric on the 3-sphere in these coordinates is given by

and the volume form by

These coordinates have an elegant description in terms of quaternions. Any unit quaternion  can be written as a versor:

where  is a unit imaginary quaternion; that is, a quaternion that satisfies . This is the quaternionic analogue of Euler's formula. Now the unit imaginary quaternions all lie on the unit 2-sphere in  so any such  can be written:

With  in this form, the unit quaternion  is given by

where  are as above.

Hopf coordinates

In complex coordinates  we write

These coordinates are useful in the description of the 3-sphere as the Hopf bundle

See image to right.

The round metric on the 3-sphere in these coordinates is given by

and the volume form by

To get the interlocking circles of the Hopf fibration, make a simple substitution in the equations above

In this case , and  specify which circle, and  specifies the position along each circle.

Stereographic coordinates

(Note that the numerator and denominator commute here even though quaternionic multiplication is generally noncommutative).

We could just as well have projected from the point , in which case the point  is given by

The inverse of this map takes  to

Note that the  coordinates are defined everywhere but  and the  coordinates everywhere but . Note that the transition function between these two charts on their overlap is given by

and vice versa.

Group structure
When considered as the set of unit quaternions,  inherits an important structure, namely that of quaternionic multiplication. Because the set of unit quaternions is closed under multiplication,  takes on the structure of a group. Moreover, since quaternionic multiplication is smooth,  can be regarded as a real Lie group. It is a nonabelian, compact Lie group of dimension 3.

One might think that , the set of unit octonions, would form a Lie group, but this fails since octonion multiplication is nonassociative. The octonionic structure does give  one important property: parallelizability.

One convenient choice is given by the Pauli matrices:

The set of unit quaternions is then given by matrices of the above form with unit determinant. This matrix subgroup is precisely the special unitary group .

It is seen that an arbitrary element  can be written as

In literature
In Edwin Abbott Abbott's Flatland, published in 1884, and in Sphereland, a 1965 sequel to Flatland by Dionys Burger, the 3-sphere is referred to as an oversphere, and a 4-sphere is referred to as a hypersphere.

Writing in the American Journal of Physics, Mark A. Peterson describes three different ways of visualizing 3-spheres and points out language in The Divine Comedy that suggests Dante viewed the Universe in the same way; Carlo Rovelli supports the same idea.

In Art Meets Mathematics in the Fourth Dimension, Stephen L. Lipscomb develops the concept of the hypersphere dimensions as it relates to art, architecture, and mathematics.

See also 
 1-sphere, 2-sphere, n-sphere
 tesseract, polychoron, simplex
 Pauli matrices
 Hopf bundle, Riemann sphere
 Poincaré sphere
 Reeb foliation
 Clifford torus

References

 David W. Henderson, Experiencing Geometry: In Euclidean, Spherical, and Hyperbolic Spaces, second edition, 2001,  (Chapter 20: 3-spheres and hyperbolic 3-spaces.)
 Jeffrey R. Weeks, The Shape of Space: How to Visualize Surfaces and Three-dimensional Manifolds, 1985, (Chapter 14: The Hypersphere) (Says: A Warning on terminology: Our two-sphere is defined in three-dimensional space, where it is the boundary of a three-dimensional ball. This terminology is standard among mathematicians, but not among physicists. So don't be surprised if you find people calling the two-sphere a three-sphere.)

External links
  Note: This article uses the alternate naming scheme for spheres in which a sphere in -dimensional space is termed an -sphere.

Four-dimensional geometry
Algebraic topology
Geometric topology
Analytic geometry
Quaternions
Spheres